The 2007 Dally M Awards were presented on Tuesday 4 September 2007 at the Sydney Town Hall in Sydney and broadcast on Fox Sports. Warren Smith presided as Master of Ceremonies a role which he had held in previous years.

Dally M Player of the Year
Presented by the Prime Minister of Australia, John Howard
Dally M Player of the Year
Winner:
Johnathan Thurston, North Queensland Cowboys

Player votes tally (top 10)

Special awards
Provan-Summons Medal (fan's choice for 2007's best player)
Presented by Norm Provan and Arthur Summons
Winner:
Nathan Hindmarsh, Parramatta Eels
Nominated:
Matt Bowen, North Queensland Cowboys
Steve Price, New Zealand Warriors
Robbie Farah, Wests Tigers

Peter Moore Award for Dally M Rookie of the Year
Winner:
Israel Folau, Melbourne Storm
Nominated:
Michael Jennings, Penrith Panthers
Cory Paterson, Newcastle Knights
Krisnan Inu, Parramatta Eels

Dally M Captain of the Year
Winner:
Steve Price, New Zealand Warriors
Nominated:
Alan Tongue, Canberra Raiders
Andrew Ryan, Canterbury Bulldogs
Cameron Smith, Melbourne Storm

Dally M Representative Player of the Year
Winner:
Cameron Smith, Melbourne Storm
Nominated:
Petero Civoniceva, Brisbane Broncos
Johnathan Thurston, North Queensland Cowboys
Steve Price, New Zealand Warriors

Dally M Coach of the Year
Winner:
Craig Bellamy, Melbourne Storm
Nominated:
Des Hasler, Manly Warringah Sea Eagles
Jason Taylor, South Sydney Rabbitohs
John Cartwright, Gold Coast Titans
Tim Sheens, Wests Tigers
Ivan Cleary, New Zealand Warriors

Peter Frilingos Memorial Award for the Headline Moment of the Year
Presented by David Penberthy, Editor of The Daily Telegraph
Winner:
Sydney Roosters golden point win over Wests Tigers in Round 22.
Nominated:
South Sydney's 37-12 win over Wests Tigers in Round 24.
Hero to Villain, Jarryd Hayne in State Of Origin 1.
Sydney Roosters and New Zealand Warriors 31-31 draw in Round 21.

Top Try Scorer
Winners:
Israel Folau, 21
Matt Bowen, 21

Top Point Scorer
Winner:
Hazem El Masri, 202

Team of the Year
Best Fullback
Winner:
Matt Bowen, North Queensland Cowboys
Nominated:
Karmichael Hunt, Brisbane Broncos
Brett Stewart, Manly Warringah Sea Eagles
Wade McKinnon, New Zealand Warriors

Best Winger
Winner:
Jarryd Hayne, Parramatta Eels
Nominated:
Hazem El Masri, Canterbury Bulldogs
Eric Grothe, Parramatta Eels
Israel Folau, Melbourne Storm

Best Centre
Winner:
Justin Hodges, Brisbane Broncos
Nominated:
Matt Cooper, St George Dragons
Timana Tahu, Parramatta Eels
Matt King, Melbourne Storm

Best Five-Eighth
Winner:
Darren Lockyer, Brisbane Broncos
Nominated:
Ben Roberts, Canterbury Bulldogs
Braith Anasta, Sydney Roosters
Jamie Lyon, Manly Warringah Sea Eagles

Best Halfback
Winner:
Johnathan Thurston, North Queensland Cowboys
Nominated:
(won by default as he won Dally M)

Best Lock
Winner:
Dallas Johnson, Melbourne Storm
Nominated:

Best Second Rower
Winner:
Anthony Watmough, Manly Warringah Sea Eagles
Nominated:
Sonny Bill Williams, Canterbury Bulldogs
Nathan Hindmarsh, Parramatta Eels
Ryan Hoffman, Melbourne Storm

Best Prop
Winner:
Steve Price, New Zealand Warriors
Nominated:
Roy Asotasi, South Sydney Rabbitohs
Petero Civoniceva, Brisbane Broncos
Luke Bailey, Gold Coast Titans

Best Hooker
Winner:
Robbie Farah, Wests Tigers
Nominated:
(awarded to Farah after presentation of Dally M, no other nominations)

Hall of Fame Inductees
 Arthur Halloway
 Tom Gorman
 Sid Pearce
 Harry Wells
 Keith Barnes
 Mick Cronin

References

2007 sports awards
2007 NRL season
2007